Dan Woog is a former state representative from Erie, Colorado. A Republican, Woog represented Colorado House of Representatives District 63, which included a large part of Weld County in northcentral Colorado.

Background
Woog works as a real estate broker and lives in Erie. Previously, he served on the Erie Economic Development Council and the Erie Planning and Zoning Commission, and he was elected and re-elected to the Erie Board of Trustees. He ran unsuccessfully for mayor of Erie in 2018. Woog earned a bachelor's degree from Arizona State University.

Election
Woog was first elected to the Colorado House of Representatives in the 2020 general election.
In the June 2020 Republican house district 63 primary, he defeated challenger Patricia E. Miller, winning 62.39% of the vote.

In the 2020 general election, Woog defeated his Democratic Party and Libertarian Party opponents, winning 59.75% of the total votes cast.

In the 2022 general election, Woog lost to Democrat Jennifer Parenti.

References

External links
Legislative website
Campaign website

Republican Party members of the Colorado House of Representatives
21st-century American politicians
Living people
People from Weld County, Colorado
Arizona State University alumni
Year of birth missing (living people)
American real estate brokers